Bogdan Dobrev (Bulgarian: Богдан Добрев; born 29 July 1957) is a Bulgarian former rower who competed in the 1980 Summer Olympics.

References

1957 births
Living people
Bulgarian male rowers
Olympic rowers of Bulgaria
Rowers at the 1980 Summer Olympics
Olympic bronze medalists for Bulgaria
Olympic medalists in rowing
Medalists at the 1980 Summer Olympics
World Rowing Championships medalists for Bulgaria